Manila Sotang is a Nepali singer.

Music
Manila was trained in music early in life by her uncle who taught her to sing bhajans. After singing playback for the film Mayalu, she was noticed as a singer. Manila has sung more than 200 songs to date. She has 10 music albums with her husband Uday Sotang. The husband-wife musical couple have contributed to Nepali Adhunik (modern) music for two-and-a-half decades.

Albums
 Jhajhalko
 Darpan
 Muskan
 Katha
 Aatma Katha
 Bhid Dekhi Bahira
 Sandesh
 Marma
 Upama
 Sambaad
 Together (Hindi ghazal album)

Personal life
Manila Sotang is originally from Darjeeling, India. She moved to Kathmandu along with her husband Uday Sotang to pursue their musical career in the late 1980s. Her daughter Shreya Sotang is a singer who has also released an album.

References

External links
 Songs by Manila Sotang

Living people
21st-century Nepalese women singers
People from Darjeeling district
Year of birth missing (living people)
Nepali-language singers from India